The 1988 Orlando Lions season was the first season of the new team in the new American Soccer League.  The club originally started in 1985.  In the league's inaugural year, the team finished in fourth place in the Southern Division of the league.  They did not make the playoffs.

Background

Review

Competitions

ASL regular season

League standings

Northern Division

Southern Division

Results summaries

Results by round

Match reports

ASL Playoffs

Bracket

Match reports

Statistics

Transfers

References 

1988
Fort Lauderdale Strikers
Orlando